Frankenstein Love is a live album recorded in 1992 at the Houston Room by Daniel Johnston. It was also released in digital format through eMusic in 2000.

Track listing

References 

Daniel Johnston albums
1998 live albums